The prime minister of New Zealand is the country's head of government and the leader of the Cabinet, whose powers and responsibilities are defined by convention. Officially, the prime minister is appointed by the governor-general, but by convention, the prime minister must have the confidence of the House of Representatives. The prime minister is always a member of parliament.

Originally, prime ministers headed loose coalitions of independents, which were often unstable; since the advent of political parties, the prime minister is usually the leader of the largest party represented in the house. Since 1935, every prime minister has been a member of either the National party or the Labour party, reflecting their domination of New Zealand politics. After the introduction of mixed-member proportional voting in 1996, prime ministers have usually needed to negotiate agreements with smaller parties to maintain a majority in Parliament.

The title of the office was originally "colonial secretary", which was formally changed to "premier" in 1869. That title remained in use almost exclusively for more than 30 years, until Richard Seddon changed it to "prime minister" during his tenure in the office; he used the title officially at the Imperial Conference of 1903.

Some historians regard James FitzGerald as New Zealand's first prime minister, although a more conventional view is that neither he nor his successor (Thomas Forsaith) should properly be given that title, as New Zealand did not yet have responsible government when they served. Most commonly, Henry Sewell, who served during 1856, is regarded as New Zealand's first premier. Beginning with Sewell, 41 individuals have so far held the premiership, not including acting prime ministers. Nine prime ministers have held the position for more than one period in office. Richard Seddon, prime minister for thirteen years between 1893 and 1906, held the office for the longest term. The youngest prime minister was Edward Stafford, who assumed office at age 37, and the oldest was Walter Nash, who left office at age 78. Three prime ministers have been women, a count equalled by Iceland, Lithuania, Poland and the United Kingdom, and only surpassed by Finland and Switzerland. 

The current prime minister is Chris Hipkins, who assumed office on 25 January 2023 following the resignation of Jacinda Ardern.

List of officeholders
The parties shown are those to which the heads of government belonged at the time they held office and the electoral districts shown are those they represented while in office. Several prime ministers belonged to parties other than those given and represented other electorates before and after their time in office. A number in brackets indicates the prime minister served a previous term in office.

Political parties

<div class="nomobile">

Timeline

See also

 List of prime ministers of New Zealand by age
 List of prime ministers of New Zealand by place of birth
 List of prime ministers of Queen Victoria
 List of prime ministers of Edward VII
 List of prime ministers of George V
 List of prime ministers of Edward VIII
 List of prime ministers of George VI
 List of prime ministers of Elizabeth II
 List of prime ministers of Charles III

References

 
Prime
Lists of heads of government